The Battle Song of Liberty is a World War I song written by Jack Yellen and composed by George L. Cobb, adapted from "Our Director" by F.E. Bigelow. The song was first published in 1917 by Walter Jacobs, in Boston, Massachusetts. The sheet music cover features the Statue of Liberty amid a sea battle with planes and marching soldiers in the background. It is dedicated to the US Army and Navy.

The sheet music can be found at the Pritzker Military Museum & Library.

References 

Bibliography
International Association of Rotary Clubs, and Rotary International. Dec 1917. The Rotarian. Chicago, Ill: The Association.
Parker, Bernard S. World War I Sheet Music 1. Jefferson: McFarland & Company, Inc., 2007. . 
Paas, John Roger. 2014. America sings of war: American sheet music from World War I. . 

1917 songs
Songs of World War I
Songs written by Jack Yellen
Songs with music by George L. Cobb
Songs about freedom